Krebs is a city in Pittsburg County, Oklahoma, United States. The population was 2,053 at the 2010 census, a slight increase from 2,051 in 2000. Its nickname is "Little Italy." Krebs was founded before Oklahoma statehood as a coal-mining town in the Choctaw Nation of Indian Territory.

History

A post office was established at Krebs, Indian Territory on February 10, 1886.  At the time of its founding, Krebs was located in Tobucksy County, a part of the Moshulatubbee District of the Choctaw Nation.  Krebs began as a coal-mining camp housing European immigrants who came to work coal mines in the surrounding area. The town is named after Judge Edmond Folsom Krebs (1821-1893), a county judge in Tobucksy County. Judge Krebs was born of mixed German and Choctaw ancestry in Winston County, Mississippi.

1892 mining explosion 
An explosion in the Osage Coal & Mining Company’s No. 11 mine on January 7, 1892 killed about 100 workers and injured another 150, but mining continued to prosper. By 1895, there were 15 mines operating nearby. The first local of the United Mine Workers in Indian Territory was founded in the town in 1898. Krebs was linked to McAlester by the Choctaw Railway and Lighting Company interurban railroad.

Early Krebs
Krebs was incorporated in the Choctaw Nation in 1903, with Mel D. Reed elected as the first mayor and Bob Miller as the first chief of police. The current St. Joseph's Catholic Church was constructed in 1903. It and an opera house were the first two brick buildings in town. An earlier church and the first opera house, both built of wood, had previously burned down.

The Krebs school system was organized in 1907, the same year that the Choctaw Nation and Indian Territory governments were replaced by the new State of Oklahoma.

The Missouri–Kansas–Texas Railroad (also known as the MKT or "Katy") built a branch from McAlester to Wilburton, on which it ran a two-coach train known affectionately as "Nellie." The Katy station was in downtown Krebs. Later, another station was built south of town on the East-West line to serve the Chicago, Rock Island & Pacific Railroad (a.k.a. CRI&P or Rock Island.) For a time, there was also an electric interurban line from McAlester through Krebs to Hartshorne.

Geography
Krebs is located at  (34.929538, -95.721064).

Attractions
Krebs is famous throughout Oklahoma for its many Italian restaurants. Isle of Capri, "Pete's Place", and Roseanna's have been active for generations. Authentic Italian fare available in Krebs that is lacking in chain restaurants includes "Lamb Fries" (fried sheep testicles).

Krebs is situated along Route 69 and at one time had a restaurant named Speed Trap BBQ, located at 403 East 270 Highway Krebs, OK 74554. The restaurant was named for the way that speed limits dropped very quickly from  around the area where the town overlaps the highway. The speed trap is infamous because it lies along a very boring stretch of road and has been policed very aggressively, so it has annoyed a large number of travelers who otherwise might have visited the town to enjoy the restaurants and other activities.

Pete's Place is now a licensed brewery and markets its "Choc" (short for "Choctaw") beer, as well as several other varieties, statewide.

Perhaps even more widely known is "Lovera’s Family Grocery", a small, authentic Italian market famous throughout the state and beyond for their lightly smoked sausage and handmade caciocavallo cheese.

The city of Krebs maintains a city park which includes a baseball park, a one-kilometer (0.6-mile) walking track, picnic facilities, a two-story replica of the gazebo that had stood in the town square, and will include playground equipment. The park stands on a portion of the old fairground/racetrack site of a hundred years ago. The Krebs Italian Band played many festivals or 'festas' at the park in bygone simpler times. For years during the 1990s, "The Ethnic Festival" was a popular attraction on Labor Day weekend, taking place on this Historical Site. Games such as bocce ball and morra were played by all for fun.

Also taking place at this location was the Terrapin Derby, originated in 1929 when Mayor J.T. Sadler visited the Miller Brothers Shows in Ponca City, Oklahoma. Mayor Sadler brought the idea back to Krebs as a fundraising idea. The derby was a success, and enough money was raised to purchase a new truck for the city. Over the years the derby raised funds that provided vehicles and equipment for one of the finest volunteer fire departments in the region.

Krebs had an Italian Band that played in a double-decker bandstand in downtown Krebs. There were at least five bandstands between McAlester and Hartshorne that the band played at on weekends, providing entertainment for families from all over. Many families rode the street car to these sites for picnics and festivals.

Krebs had five newspapers at different times: Krebs Eagle, Krebs Cyclone, Krebs Banner, Krebs Advertiser, and The Oklahoma Miner.

The Krebs Opera House was re-built as a brick structure in 1903, after the first one had been destroyed by fire the previous year. It and the St. Joseph's Catholic Church were the first brick buildings to go up in Krebs. It was the only place for miles around that featured stage shows. Many fine road shows played here, and moving pictures were shown in the Opera House, also. The Dreamland Theater, owned and operated by Mr. & Mrs. David Holstead, later became the popular movie theater in Krebs. The original wooden St. Joseph's Church also burned in 1902, and was replaced by a brick church in 1903. It has been  completely refurbished in recent years.

Demographics

As of the census of 2000, there were 2,051 people, 858 households, and 560 families residing in the city. The population density was 601.6 people per square mile (232.2/km). The racial makeup of the city was 78.40% White, 1.17% African-American, 13.60% Native American, 0.44% Asian, 0.49% from other races, and 5.90% from two or more races. Hispanic or Latino of any race were 1.66% of the population.

There were 858 households, out of which 33.9% had children under the age of 18 living with them, 47.3% were married couples living together, 15.3% had a female householder with no husband present, and 34.7% were non-families. 31.5% of all households were made up of individuals, and 14.1% had someone living alone who was 65 years of age or older. The average household size was 2.39, and the average family size was 3.00.

In the city, the population was spread out, with 27.3% under the age of 18, 9.7% from 18 to 24, 28.6% from 25 to 44, 21.6% from 45 to 64, and 12.8% who were 65 years of age or older. The median age was 34 years. For every 100 females, there were 91.0 males. For every 100 females age 18 and over, there were 86.8 males.

The median income for a household in the city was $24,514, and the median income for a family was $31,641. Males had a median income of $27,321 versus $17,235 for females. The per capita income for the city was $13,042. About 16.6% of families and 19.1% of the population were below the poverty line, including 25.2% of those under age 18 and 10.7% of those age 65 or over.

Government
Krebs has a mayor-council form of government. The current mayor is Bobby Watkins. The city has four council persons.
 
Krebs has a small police force with four officers.

In popular culture
Krebs is featured prominently in The Hot Kid, a fictional novel by Elmore Leonard about 1930s-era gangsters and lawmen.

See also
St. Joseph's Catholic Church

References

External links
 Spearman, Pat. "Krebs." Encyclopedia of Oklahoma History & Culture
 "Oklahoma miner" newspaper  hosted by the Gateway to Oklahoma History.
  White, Kathryn Jenson. "Ciao Down in Oklahoma's Little Italy." Oklahoma Today. pp. 10 – 13. May-June 1986.

Cities in Oklahoma
Cities in Pittsburg County, Oklahoma
Italian-American culture
Little Italys in the United States